"I Can't Stop Feeling" is a song by German girl group Queensberry. It was written by Teemu Brunila and Kid Crazy and produced by John McLaughlin and Dave James for their debut album Volume I (2008). Serving as their debut, it was released as a double A-side, backed with their 2008 promotional debut single "No Smoke", on 20 February 2009. The ballad reached the top thirty of the German Singles Chart.

Formats and track listings

Charts

References

2008 songs
2009 songs
Queensberry (band) songs
Warner Records singles
Songs written by Teemu Brunila